The Advertiser is the name of a number of newspapers around the world:

Australia 
 Ararat Advertiser, a regional newspaper in Ararat, Victoria published by Australian Community Media (ACM)
 Bendigo Advertiser (1853–), a daily newspaper in Bendigo, Victoria published by ACM
 Melbourne Advertiser (1838–1848), a defunct newspaper in Melbourne, Victoria
 The Advertiser (Adelaide) (1858–), a daily News Corporation tabloid in Adelaide, South Australia
 The Advertiser (Bairnsdale) (1877–), a regional newspaper in Bairnsdale, Victoria
 The Advertiser, a regional newspaper in Cessnock, New South Wales published by ACM
 The Footscray Advertiser (1874–1882) a weekly newspaper in Footscray, Victoria
 The Advertiser (Hurstbridge) (1922–1939), the name of a defunct newspaper in north-east Melbourne first published as the Evelyn Observer
 Wollongong Advertiser (1982–), a regional newspaper in Wollongong, New South Wales published by ACM
 The Advertiser (1921–1932), a tri-weekly newspaper in Fremantle, Western Australia that incorporated the Fremantle Times and the Fremantle Herald (the 1913–1919 incarnation)

United Kingdom 
 The name of several local newspapers owned by Archant
Surrey Advertiser, a weekly newspaper in Surrey, England
 Advertiser, titles from the Greater Manchester Weekly Newspapers Group
 Glossop Advertiser
 Oldham Advertiser
 Tameside Advertiser

Elsewhere 
  The Advertiser, a twice-weekly newspaper in Grand Falls-Windsor, Newfoundland and Labrador, Canada
 Anderson Valley Advertiser, a weekly newspaper in Anderson Valley, California, United States

See also 
 Advertiser (disambiguation)
 The Daily Advertiser (disambiguation)